Red Perkins (August 3, 1920 – August 15, 1990) was an American country music singer from Ohio, United States.

Early life
Perkins was born in Kentucky.

Career
Perkins worked from a home base of Dayton, Ohio.

Selected discography
As Red Perkins, Red Perkins and the Kentucky Redheads who recorded with De Luxe Records and King Records
 1948: "One Has My Name (The Other Has My Heart)/I Live The Life I Love", 78rpm single (De Luxe Records/King Records 5047)
 1948: "Someday You'll Call My Name/You're Gonna Regret It All Someday", 78rpm single (De Luxe Records/King Records 5052)
 1949: "Aggravating Lou From Louisville/Hoedown Boogie", 78rpm single (King Records 792)
 1949: "I Know Better Now/Too Long", 78rpm single (King Records 823)
 1950: "Crocodile Tears/I Hate You", 78rpm single (King Records 836)
 1950: "One At A Time/I'm So Happy I Could Cry", 78rpm single (King Records 850)
 1950: "Big Blue Diamonds/Rag Man Boogie", 78rpm single (King Records 903)
 1951: "I'm Gonna Rush Right Down To Macon/A Long Necked Bottle", 78rpm single (King Records 920)

Former members (partial list)
 Jim Alexander
 Jesse Ashlock
 Cecil Brower (alumni of the Milton Brown Band)
 Fred Calhoun
 Harry Fooks
 Clarence Gray
 Jay Green
 Wilbert H. (Bill) Osborne
 Jabbo Smith, trumpet
 Anna Mae Winburn, singer

References

External links
 

1920 births
1990 deaths
American country singer-songwriters
Country musicians from Ohio
Country musicians from Kentucky
Singer-songwriters from Ohio
Singer-songwriters from Kentucky